Zanclognatha lituralis, the lettered zanclognatha, is a litter moth of the family Erebidae. It was described by Jacob Hübner in 1818. It is found from in North America from Wisconsin to Nova Scotia, and south to Florida and Texas.

Adults are on wing from May to August. There is one generation in the north and at least a partial second generation from Ohio and Connecticut southward.

The larvae feed on detritus, including dead leaves.

External links

lituralis
Moths described in 1818
Moths of North America
Taxa named by Jacob Hübner